Langar-e Jadid (also Romanized as Langar-e Jadīd; also known as Langar and Longor) is a village in Miyan Ab-e Shomali Rural District, in the Central District of Shushtar County, Khuzestan Province, Iran. At the 2006 census, its population was 818, in 177 families.

References 

Populated places in Shushtar County